Margarita Isabel (born Margarita Isabel Morales y González; 25 July 1943 – 9 April 2017) was a Mexican Ariel Award-winning film and television actress.

She died on 9 April 2017, aged 75, from emphysema.

Filmography

Awards and nominations

References

External links 

1941 births
2017 deaths
Mexican telenovela actresses
Mexican television actresses
Mexican film actresses
Mexican stage actresses
Actresses from Mexico City
Ariel Award winners
Best Supporting Actress Ariel Award winners
20th-century Mexican actresses
21st-century Mexican actresses
People from Mexico City
Respiratory disease deaths in Mexico
Deaths from emphysema